The Image Maker is a 1917 American silent drama film directed by Eugene Moore and starring Valda Valkyrien, Harris Gordon and Inda Palmer.

Cast
 Valda Valkyrien as Ashubetis / Marian Bell 
 Harris Gordon as Prince Tsa / John Arden 
 Inda Palmer as Mrs. Bell 
 Morgan Jones as The Pharaoh 
 Arthur Bauer as Maxon 
 Boyd Marshall

References

Bibliography
 Soister, John T. American Silent Horror, Science Fiction and Fantasy Feature Films, 1913-1929. McFarland, 2014.

External links

1917 films
1917 drama films
Silent American drama films
Films directed by Eugene Moore
American silent feature films
1910s English-language films
Pathé Exchange films
American black-and-white films
1910s American films